The fourth season of M*A*S*H aired Fridays at 8:30–9:00 pm from September 12 to November 28, 1975 and Tuesdays at 9:00–9:30 pm from December 2, 1975 to February 24, 1976 on CBS.

Cast

Episodes

Notes

References

External links 
 List of M*A*S*H (season 4) episodes at the Internet Movie Database

1975 American television seasons
1976 American television seasons
MASH 04